Lucrezia Ruggiero (born 7 June 2000) is an Italian artistic swimmer. She won one gold medal each at the 2022 World Aquatics Championships in the mixed duet technical routine and the mixed duet free routine. At the 2022 European Aquatics Championships, she won gold medals in the mixed duet technical routine and the mixed duet free routine.

Background
Ruggiero was born 7 June 2000 in Rome, Italy, where she trains and competes for sports club Gruppo Sportivo Fiamme Oro. She has been training with her professional artistic swimming partner for mixed duet events, Giorgio Minisini, since 2019.

Career

2021 Artistic Swimming World Series
At the 2021 FINA Artistic Swimming World Series leg held in June in Barcelona, Spain, Ruggiero and her partner Giorgio Minisini won the silver medal in the mixed duet free routine with a score of 88.6332 points. For their performance, the duo chose to choreograph their routine to the song "Stairway to Heaven" by Led Zeppelin.

2022 World Aquatics Championships

On the second day of artistic swimming at the 2022 World Aquatics Championships, contested in June in Budapest, Hungary, Ruggiero and her partner Giorgio Minisini scored 88.5734 points in the preliminaries of the mixed duet technical routine to qualify for the final ranking first. Day four, 20 June, the duo won the gold medal with a score of 89.2685 points, finishing 2.6746 points ahead of silver medalists Tomoka Sato and Yotaro Sato of Japan and 2.8260 points ahead of bronze medalists Shi Haoyu and Zhang Yiyao of China. Four days later, in the preliminaries of the mixed duet free routine, she and Minisini advanced to the final with a score of 90.5000 points. The following day, 25 June, they won the gold medal with a score of 90.9667 points and choreography to music by Italian band Måneskin in the theme of "Risorgimento".

2022 European Aquatics Championships
For her first of two events at the 2022 European Aquatics Championships, held in Rome in August, Ruggiero and her partner Giorgio Minisini won the gold medal in the mixed duet free routine with a score of 89.7333 points, placing over four points ahead of silver medalists Pau Ribes and Emma García of Spain. In her second event, she and Giorgio Minisini won the gold medal in the mixed duet technical routine, this time outscoring the Spaniards Pau Ribes and Emma García by over five points with a final mark of 89.3679 points.

2023 Artistic Swimming World Cup
For the stop of the 2023 Artistic Swimming World Cup held in March in Markham, Canada, Ruggiero and her partner Linda Cerruti won the gold medal in the women's duet free routine with a final mark of 321.2667 points, outscoring the silver medalists from Ukraine by over 25 points and the bronze medalists from Israel by over 35 points.

International championships

See also
 Italy at the 2022 World Aquatics Championships

References

External links
 

2000 births
Living people
Italian synchronized swimmers
Artistic swimmers of Fiamme Oro
Swimmers from Rome
World Aquatics Championships medalists in synchronised swimming
Artistic swimmers at the 2022 World Aquatics Championships
European Aquatics Championships medalists in synchronised swimming
21st-century Italian women